Crow Butte is a uranium mining operation located  southeast of the city of Crawford in Dawes County, Nebraska, United States. Cameco Corporation owns and operates Crow Butte through its wholly owned subsidiary, Crow Butte Resources, Inc.

History
Crow Butte was the first uranium mine developed in Nebraska. It was discovered in 1980 and begin production in April 1991. It is a roll-front uranium deposit, mined using in-situ recovery (ISR). Due to weakening of the uranium market, production ceased in 2018. The project is under care and maintenance pending an improvement in uranium prices.

Description
At Crow Butte, uranium ore is mined in place underground in well fields. A solution of water, oxygen and sodium bicarbonate (baking soda) is injected into the orebody, which liberates the uranium from its sandstone host and  allows recovery by production wells. The solution is pumped to the surface and uranium is removed at the processing plant. The mine's processing plants and well fields have a licensed capacity of 2 million pounds per year.

During 2015 Crow Butte produced 0.4 million pounds U3O8, 33% less than 2014, due to a declining head grade. Between 2002 and 2015, the Crow Butte operation produced 10.1 million pounds of U3O8.

Resources
As of 31 December 2019 the measured and indicated resources at Crow Butte were 13.9 million pounds of U3O8 at a grade of 0.25%. The developed uranium deposit at Crow Butte has been progressively depleted by production.

License expansion
To allow the mine plant to continue operating, three new expansion sites are under application for license review by the US Nuclear Regulatory Commission, all within several miles of the plant. Material from the three sites would be transported to the central plant at Crow Butte for final processing. In 2015, the Oglala Sioux Tribe lodged six objections with the Atomic Safety and Licensing Board against the expansion of the mine's operating license to include the Marsland Expansion Area (south of the current site), claiming Crow Butte was a sacred site and within their treaty territory. Construction at Marsland create surface  disturbance of 600 acres, with future construction disturbing another 1,160 acres.

Ownership
The Crow Butte facility was originally developed by Wyoming Fuel Corporation in 1986 and subsequently acquired and operated by Ferret Exploration Company of Nebraska.  In 1994, Ferret Exploration Company changed its name to Crow Butte Resources, Inc. In 1998 Crow Butte Resources was acquired by Cameco Resources Inc., the U.S. subsidiary of the Canadian company, Cameco Corporation. Cameco is the largest producer of uranium in the USA, and accounts for 18% of global uranium production from its mines in Canada, the USA and Kazakhstan.

See also
Sandstone uranium deposits

References

Buildings and structures in Dawes County, Nebraska
Uranium mines in the United States
Geology of Nebraska
Solution mines in the United States
Mines in Nebraska